CISQ-FM is an FM radio station owned by Rogers Sports & Media and operating in southwestern British Columbia. It broadcasts at 107.1 MHz in Squamish and 102.1 MHz in Whistler. It broadcasts an adult contemporary format branded as Mountain FM.

History
The station was founded in 1981 by Mountain Broadcasting, which was sold to Selkirk Communications in January 1989. Selkirk, in turn, was sold to Maclean-Hunter in September 1989, and CISQ was resold to Rogers Communications as part of the purchase. The station was relaunched with an adult contemporary format on August 29, 2003. The format later changed again in 2010.

CISQ-FM has gone through a number of frequency changes. Since the launch in 1982, the station originally began broadcasting at 104.9 FM. In 1987, CISQ moved from 104.9 to 98.3 FM and to 104.7 FM the same year. In 1988, CISQ settled to its current frequency at 107.1 FM.

Rebroadcasters
 

On May 22, 2013, the CRTC approved Rogers' application to relocate CISW-FM Whistler from its current location to a CBC-owned tower in Whistler. This relocation will result in a decrease in the average effective radiated power (ERP) from 586 to 474 watts (directional antenna with a decrease in the maximum ERP from 1,430 to 1,000 watts) as well as an increase in the effective height of antenna above average terrain from -306.2 metres to -238.3 metres.

In August 2014, CIEG-FM in Egmont was renamed to CKLG-FM in order to rename the call sign of a Rogers-owned station in Vancouver. Then in March 2015, Rogers switched the call sign of CKKS-FM in Sechelt to CFUN-FM for a Rogers-owned station serving Metro Vancouver and the Fraser Valley.

References

External links
Mountain FM
 
 

Isq
Isq
Isq
Radio stations established in 1981
1981 establishments in British Columbia